The Petropedetidae are a  family of frogs containing three genera and 12 species. They are found in sub-Saharan tropical Africa and are sometimes known under common name African torrent frogs.

They are inhabitants of the splash-water zone of clear-running streams predominantly in forests. Tadpoles are either semiterrestrial in the spray zone or fully aquatic in zones of the strongest currents. Some species guard their clutches. They are small (Ericabatrachus) or medium- to large-sized frogs (Arthroleptides and Petropedetes).

Taxonomy
The Petropedetidae are related to true frogs, family Ranidae, and have often been considered as a subfamily within a broadly defined Ranidae. However, they are now commonly treated as a family, although the genera included may differ between sources. In particular, Conraua is sometimes included in the Petropedetidae, instead of forming its own monogeneric family Conrauidae.

Genera
The three genera in the family are:
 Arthroleptides Nieden, 1911 – African torrent frogs, three species
 Ericabatrachus Largen, 1991 – Bale Mountains frogs, one species
 Petropedetes Reichenow, 1874 – African water frogs, nine species

Recognition of Arthroleptides as a genus separate from Petropedetes is relatively recent.

References

 
Amphibian families
Taxa named by Gladwyn Kingsley Noble
Afrotropical realm fauna